Luria is a play by Robert Browning. It was first printed with A Soul's Tragedy as the concluding number of Bells and Pomegranates (No. VIII) in April 1846. It is a tragedy in blank verse.

Persons 

 Luria, a Moor, Commander of the Florentine Forces
 Husain, a Moor, his friend
 Puccio, the old Florentine Commander, now Luria's Chief Officer
 Braccio, Commissary of the Republic of Florence
 Jacopo (Lapo), his Secretary
 Tiburzio, Commander of the Pisans
 Domizia, a noble Florentine Lady

Time, 14—

References

Sources 

 Birch, Dinah, ed. (2009). "Luria". In The Oxford Companion to English Literature. 7th ed. Oxford University Press. Retrieved 20 October 2022.
 Scudder, Horace E. (1895). The Complete Poetic and Dramatic Works of Robert Browning. Boston and New York: Houghton, Mifflin and Co.; Cambridge: The Riverside Press. pp. 289, 299.

Plays by Robert Browning
1846 plays